Moïse (Moyse) Fortier (November 6, 1815 – October 17, 1877) was a Quebec businessman and political figure. He was a Liberal member of the House of Commons of Canada representing Yamaska from 1867 to 1872.

He was born in Saint-Léon in 1815. He became a merchant at Saint-David-d'Yamaska and was also president of the Richelieu, Drummond and Arthabaska Railway. He served as mayor of Saint-David for 22 years. In 1861, he was elected to the Legislative Assembly of the Province of Canada in Yamaska; he was re-elected in 1863 and was elected to the Canadian House of Commons after Confederation.

He died at Saint-David-d'Yamaska in 1877.

External links

1815 births
1877 deaths
Members of the Legislative Assembly of the Province of Canada from Canada East
Liberal Party of Canada MPs
Members of the House of Commons of Canada from Quebec
Mayors of places in Quebec